The Hellenic Organization for Standardization (Ellīnikós Organismós Typopoíīsīs; abbreviated ΕΛΟΤ in Greek and ELOT in English) is the national standards organization for the Hellenic Republic (Greece). It issues Greece's conformance marks and is responsible for various Greek standards, notably , Greece's official format for romanization of  Modern Greek.

See also
 International Organization for Standardization, of which ELOT is a member

External links
 Official webpage  
Tool for converting Greek to Latin characters using ELOT 743 
 ELOT 743 

Government agencies of Greece